Bawden is an English surname. Notable people with the surname include:

 Bob Bawden (1917–1980), Australian football player
 Charles Bawden (born 1924), professor of Mongolian, University of London
 David Bawden (1959–2022), American sedevacantist claimant to the papacy
 Edward Bawden (1903–1989), English painter, illustrator and graphic artist
 Frederick Charles Bawden (1908–1972), British plant pathologist and virologist
 Grace Bawden (born 1992), Australian singer
 Jeff Bawden (1924–2006), English rugby player
 Kevin Bawden (born 1946), Australian Paralympics competitor
 Lionel Bawden (born 1974), Australian visual artist
 Louise Bawden (born 1981), Australian beach volleyball player
 Nick Bawden (born 1996), American football player
 Nina Bawden (1925–2012), English novelist and children's writer
 Peter Bawden (1929–1991), Canadian businessman and politician
 Russell Bawden (born 1973), Australian rugby player
 William Bawden (1563–1632), English Jesuit implicated in the Gunpowder plot

English-language surnames